Fred Thomas Koury Jr. (born June 12, 1943) better known by his ring name ”Flying” Fred Curry, is an American professional wrestler of Lebanese descent. The son of "Wild Bull" Curry, Fred Koury was one of the most popular stars in the Midwest United States and the rest of the world during the 1960s and 70s'. Flying Fred Curry had notable feuds with wrestling legend The Sheik. Flying Fred Was a sensational star in Texas in the sixties and teamed up with Fritz von Erich. Flying Fred Curry is noted as one of the greatest highflyers and dropkickers of all time. His most famous feat is throwing 15 to 20 dropkicks in a matter of 10 seconds. Curry was chosen the most popular wrestler in the world in 1972.

Career
In the 1960s, Koury, Jr. took up wrestling under the name "Flying" Fred Curry. Unlike his father, Fred was a clean cut, high flying wrestler, and a fan favorite. The two Currys teamed up on a regular basis during the early part of the younger Curry’s career. The two won the NWA International Tag Team Championship in 1964 and held it until 1966, as well as beating Nikolai and Boris Volkoff for the Detroit version of the NWA World Tag Team Championship.

Later in his career Fred Curry struck out on his own trying to get away from his father’s legacy of rulebreaking. Fred’s attempts to get out of his father’s shadow never caused any problems between the two Currys.

In December 1972, he defeated Kurt Von Hess and Karl Von Shotz along with Tony Marino to win the Detroit version of NWA World Tag Team Championship. On January 5, 1973, they lost the titles back to Kurt Von Hess and Karl Von Shotz. They received their second Detroit titles on February 2 and lost it back to Kurt Von Hess and Karl Von Shotz on February 18.

A family business
Curry's son Fred III is currently pursuing a career in pro-wrestling and was being trained by Dory Funk, Jr. Fred III has taken the high-flying style similar to his father. He is currently wrestling in the independent circuit in the Northeastern United States.

Championships and accomplishments
50th State Big Time Wrestling
NWA Hawaii Heavyweight Championship (1 time)
NWA Detroit
NWA World Tag Team Championship (Detroit version) (9 times) - with Billy Red Lyons (1), Dan Miller (1), Tony Marino (4), Luis Martinez (1), Bobo Brazil (1), and Hank Miller (1)
NWA Big Time Wrestling
NWA American Tag Team Championship (1 time) - with Fritz Von Erich
NWA International Tag Team Championship (1 time) – with "Wild Bull" Curry
NWA Texas Junior Heavyweight Championship (1 time)
National Wrestling Federation
NWF World Tag Team Championship (1 time) - with Luis Martínez
Pro Wrestling Illustrated
PWI Most Popular Wrestler of the Year (1972) tied with Jack Brisco

References

External links
Wild Bull Curry Official Website - including The Walking Riot book written by Flying Fred Curry
The Curry Family official Website

Online World of Wrestling Profile
CageMatch.de - Fred Curry Sr.

1943 births
American male professional wrestlers
American people of Lebanese descent
Professional wrestlers billed from Connecticut
Professional wrestlers from Connecticut
Sportspeople from Hartford, Connecticut
Living people
Sportspeople of Lebanese descent
20th-century professional wrestlers
NWF World Tag Team Champions
NWA International Tag Team Champions